Konar Sandal (also Romanized as Konār Şandal, Kenar Sandal, and Konār-e Şandal; also known as Kunār Sandal and Tump-i-Kunār Sandal) is a village in Hoseynabad Rural District, Esmaili District, Anbarabad County, Kerman Province, Iran. At the 2006 census, its population was 1,044, in 209 families.

Archaeology 
Located nearby is Konar Sandal, a Bronze Age archaeological site. It  consists of two mounds a few kilometers apart called Konar Sandal A and B, as well as several other smaller sites. They were discovered in the early 2000s. These sites are associated with Jiroft culture of the 3rd millennium BC.

References 

Populated places in Anbarabad County